is a Japanese politician of the Democratic Party of Japan, a member of the House of Councillors in the Diet (national legislature). A native of Nogata, Fukuoka and graduate of Nihon University, he served in the city assembly of Nogata. After two unsuccessful runs for the House of Representatives in 2003 and 2005, he was elected to the House of Councillors for the first time in 2007.

References

External links 
  in Japanese.

Members of the House of Councillors (Japan)
Living people
1961 births
Democratic Party of Japan politicians
Japanese municipal councilors
Politicians from Fukuoka Prefecture
Nihon University alumni
Risshō Kōsei Kai people